Justice Spence may refer to:

Ara Spence (1793–1866), associate justice of the Maryland Court of Appeals
Homer R. Spence (1891–1973), associate justice of the Supreme Court of California